Molly Reynolds may refer to:

 Molly Reynolds (director), screenwriter and director of Australian films.
 List of EastEnders characters (2009)#Molly Reynolds, character in the UK series EastEnders.